A cycle track, separated bike lane or protected bike lane (sometimes historically referred to as a sidepath) is an exclusive bikeway that has elements of a separated path and on-road bike lane. A cycle track is located within or next to the roadway, but is made distinct from both the sidewalk and general purpose roadway by vertical barriers or elevation differences.

In urban planning, cycle tracks are designed to encourage bicycling in an effort to relieve automobile congestion and reduce pollution, reduce bicycling fatalities and injuries by eliminating the need for cars and bicycles to jockey for the same road space, and to reduce overall confusion and tension for all users of the road.

Cycle tracks may be one-way or two-way, and may be at road level, at sidewalk level, or at an intermediate level. They all have in common some separation from motor traffic with bollards, car parking, barriers or boulevards.  Barriers may include curbs, concrete berms, posts, planting/median strips, walls, trenches, or fences.  They are often accompanied by a curb extension or other features at intersections to simplify crossing.

In the UK, cycle track is a roadway constructed specifically for use by cyclists, but not by any other vehicles. In Ireland cycle track also covers cycle lanes marked on the carriageway but only if accompanied by a specific sign. In the UK, a cycle track may be alongside a roadway (or carriageway) for all vehicles or it may be on its own alignment. The term does not include cycle lanes or other facilities within an all-vehicle carriageway.

Impact

Levels of bicycle traffic 

In the United States, an academic analysis of eight cycle tracks found that they had increased bike traffic on the street by 75 percent within one year of installation. Rider surveys indicated that 10 percent of riders after installation would have chosen a different mode for that trip without the cycle track, and 25 percent said they were biking more in general since the installation of the cycle track. However, scientific research indicates that different groups of cyclists show varying preferences of which aspects of cycling infrastructure are most relevant when choosing a specific cycling route over another; thus these different preferences need to be accounted for in order to maximize utilization of new cycling infrastructure.

A 2015 study of a street in Toronto, Canada where cycle tracks replaced a painted cycle lane involved a survey of cyclists. Results reported 38% would use other travel modes than cycling before the redevelopment (most of whom would take transit). An improvement to safety was the most commonly cited reason.

Safety 

Recent studies generally affirm that segregated cycle tracks have a better safety record between intersections than cycling on major roads in traffic. The increase in cycling caused by cycle tracks may lead to a "safety in numbers" effect though some contributors caution against this hypothesis. Older studies tended to come to negative conclusions about mid-block cycle track safety.

The implications for road safety of cycle tracks at intersections is disputed. Studies generally show an increase in collisions at junctions, especially where cyclists are travelling in the direction opposite to the flow of traffic (e.g. on two-way cycle tracks). Protected intersection designs generally improve safety records over non-protected junction types.

Specifications

Netherlands 
The Dutch guidance for cycle traffic specifies that one-way cycle paths should be a minimum width of 2 metres.

United Kingdom 
The LTN 1/20 guidance covers cycle infrastructure design in England and Northern Ireland. LTN 1/20 states that one-way cycle tracks should be a minimum of 1.5-2.5 metres depending on the number of cyclists. Two-way cycle tracks should be a minimum of 2-4 m, depending on the number of cyclists.

Cycling by Design covers cycle infrastructure design in Scotland. It specifies a width of minimum width varying from 1.5 to 2.5 metres for one-way tracks and between 2 and 4 metres for two-way tracks. Shared pedestrian tracks should only be used if there are less than 300 cycles per hour at the peak hour and it should be 4 metres (2.5 metres at minimum).

Gallery

See also

 Bikeway safety, including studies on the safety of cycle tracks
 Bikeway and legislation
 Bikeway controversies
 Bikeways
 Cycling infrastructure
 List of cycleways
 Outline of cycling
 Rail trail

References

Cycling infrastructure
Transport infrastructure